London, Midland and Scottish Railway (LMS) Royal Scot Class 6100 (British Railways' number 46100) Royal Scot (formerly 6152 King's Dragoon Guardsman prior to identity swap) is a preserved British steam locomotive.

History 
The original 6100 was the first of its class, built in 1927 by the North British Locomotive Company in Glasgow.  It was named Royal Scot after the Royal Scots.

In 1933, 6152 The King's Dragoon Guardsman and 6100 swapped identities permanently. 6152 had been built at Derby Works in 1930. The new Royal Scot was sent to the Century of Progress Exposition of 1933 and toured Canada and the United States with a train of typical LMS carriages.

The locomotive was shipped, partially disassembled, aboard the Canadian Pacific ship .

Following the tour, special commemorative plates were fitted below the nameplates which read:

6100 was renumbered 46100 by British Railways after nationalisation in 1948.  In 1950 46100 was rebuilt with a 2A taper boiler, and the words "Prior to conversion" were added to its nameplates.  It became a markedly different engine. In October 1962 46100 was withdrawn from service in Nottingham.

Allocations 
The shed locations of 46100 on particular dates:

Preservation 

46100 was bought by Billy Butlin of Butlins holiday camps after withdrawal and after cosmetic restoration into LMS crimson lake at Crewe Works, although this was the original livery received, the locomotive did not carry it after being rebuilt (only one rebuilt Royal Scot ever carried LMS crimson lake livery and that was 6170 British Legion). It was then towed from Crewe Works to Nottingham by Black 5 No. 45038 and then from Nottingham to Boston by B1 No. 61177 on 12 June 1963.

After spending a few days at Boston shed it was taken to Skegness by an Ivatt 4MT. Then it languished in the goods yard for 3 weeks before being taken by a Pickford's low loader for the short road trip to Ingoldmells.

Royal Scot arrived at Butlins on 18 July 1963 piped in by pipers from the 1st Battalion, The Royal Scots. This made 6100 one of two preserved rebuilt Royal Scots, the other being 6115 Scots Guardsman.  It was set on a plinth at Skegness and was to remain there till the 1970s. On 16 March 1971 6100 departed from Skegness for the Bressingham Steam Museum and was returned to steam in 1972. It ran until 1978 when it once more became a static exhibit, it was eventually sold from Butlins to Bressingham in May 1989.

After sale to the Royal Scot Locomotive and General Trust (RSL&GT) in April 2009, chaired by enthusiast Jeremy Hosking, it was moved by road to Pete Waterman's LNWR Heritage workshops in Crewe.

On 20 March 2009, Royal Scot caught fire en route to a steam gala at the West Somerset Railway. The locomotive was being transported along the M5 Motorway when a fire started on the lorry under the loco's leading wheels. The engine was later withdrawn from service due to a number of mechanical problems after completion from its previous restoration and it was decided to give the engine a complete overhaul to mainline standards.

She performed her light and loaded test runs on Tue 22 & Wed 23 December 2015 and worked her debut railtour on Sat 6 February 2016.

Media
6100 is featured as a computer-controlled locomotive in Microsoft Train Simulator, which the players have no control over; however, this locomotive can be modded to be drivable.

References

External links 

 Icons of Steam
 46100 Royal Scot
 Railuk database
 Preserved locomotive database
 https://www.flickr.com/photos/68647057@N06/albums/72157663661901214 Photographs from Royal Scot's inaugural railtour on 6 February 2016.

6100
Preserved London, Midland and Scottish Railway steam locomotives
Royal Scot
Railway locomotives introduced in 1927
Standard gauge steam locomotives of Great Britain